Managing Carmen is a 2012 play by David Williamson about a cross-dressing football player.

The play was inspired by Williamson's concern over the influence of managers in  Australian Rules Football.

References

External links
Review of 2012 Brisbane production at The Australian
Review of 2012 Brisbane production at Crikey
Review of 2014 Queanbeyan production at Sydney Morning Herald

2012 plays
Plays by David Williamson